Final Battle (2016) was the 15th Final Battle professional wrestling pay-per-view (PPV) event produced by Ring of Honor (ROH). It took place on December 2, 2016 at the Hammerstein Ballroom in New York City, New York.

Storylines
Final Battle featured professional wrestling matches, which involved different wrestlers from pre-existing scripted feuds, plots, and storylines that played out on ROH's television programs prior to the show. Wrestlers portrayed villains or heroes as they followed a series of events that built tension and culminated in a wrestling match or series of matches.

Results

See also
List of Ring of Honor pay-per-view events
2016 in professional wrestling

References

External links
Ring of Honor's official website

2016 in New York City
Events in New York City
2016
Professional wrestling in New York City
December 2016 events in the United States
2016 Ring of Honor pay-per-view events